Aleksandr Mavrin (ru)
 Abdulmalik Magomedov (ru)
 Akhmed Magomedov (ru)
 Dibirgadzhi Magomedov (ru)
 Adilgerey Magomedtagirov
 Igor Madenov (ru)
 Vitaly Mayboroda (ru)
 Nikolai Maydenov (ru)
 Nikolai Mayorov (ru)
 Leonid Makarenkov (ru)
 Vadim Makarov (ru)
 Nikolai Makarov
 Nikolai Makarovets (ru)
 Vladimir Makeev (ru)
 Vladimir Maksakov (ru)
 Vladimir Maksimchuk (ru)
 Mikhail Malakhov (ru)
 Yuri Malenchenko
 Igor Malikov (ru)
 Mikhail Malofeev
 Oleg Malochuev (ru)
 Akhmed Malsagov
 Aleksandr Margelov (ru)
 Vitaly Marienko (ru)
 Viktor Markelov (ru)
 Anton Marchenko (ru)
 Vladimir Marchenko (ru)
 Igor Marenkov (ru)
 Aleksandr Maslov (ru)
 Dmitry Maslov (ru)
 Ivan Maslov (ru)
 Sergey Maslov (ru)
 Viktor Matveev (ru)
 Vyacheslav Matveev (ru)
 Vyacheslav Matvienko (ru)
 Aleksey Matiyasevich (ru)
 Igor Matkovsky (ru)
 Aleksandr Matovnikov
 Aleksandr Makhlay (ru)
 Aleksey Makhotin (ru)
 Dmitry Medvedev
 Sergey Medvedev (paratrooper) (ru)
 Sergey Medvedev (border guard) (ru)
 Igor Medoev (ru)
 Vladimir Mezokh (ru)
 Sergey Melnikov (ru)
 Andrey Merzlikin (ru)
 Vasily Merkulov (ru)
 Igor Milyutin (ru)
 Mikhail Minenkov (ru)
 Dmitry Mironov (ru)
 Aleksandr Misurkin
 Yuri Mitikov (ru)
 Aleksandr Mikhailov (ru)
 Babu-Dorzho Mikhailov (ru)
 Vladimir Mikhailov
 Sergey Mikheev (ru)
 Igor Mishin (ru)
 Aleksandr Moiseev
 Yuri Moiseev (ru)
 Igor Moldovanov (ru)
 Sergey Molodov (ru)
 Aleksandr Monetov (ru)
 Nikolai Monetov (ru)
 Igor Morev (ru)
 Andrey Morozov (ru)
 Sergey Morozov (ru)
 Stanislav Morozov (ru)
 Aleksey Morokhovets (ru)
 Mikhail Motsak
 Mikhail Mudrov
 Aleksandr Muravyov (ru)
 Rustam Muradov
 Khalid Murachuev (ru)
 Georgy Murzin (ru)
 Talgat Musabaev
 Tulpar Musalaev (ru)
 Rais Mustafin (ru)
 Oleg Mutovin (ru)
 Vener Mukhametgareev (ru)
 Timur Mukhutdinov (ru)
 Sergey Mylnikov (ru)
 Mikhail Myasnikov (ru)

References 
 

Heroes M